P. A. Semi (originally Palo Alto Semiconductor) was an American fabless semiconductor company founded in Santa Clara, California in 2003 by Daniel W. Dobberpuhl, who was previously the lead designer for the DEC Alpha 21064 and StrongARM processors. The company employed a 150-person engineering team which included people who had previously worked on processors like Itanium, Opteron and UltraSPARC. Apple Inc acquired P.A. Semi for $278 million in April 2008.

History
P. A. Semi concentrated on making powerful and power-efficient Power ISA processors called PWRficient, based on the PA6T processor core. The PA6T was the first Power ISA core to be designed from scratch outside the AIM alliance (i.e. not by Apple, IBM, or Motorola/Freescale) in ten years. Texas Instruments was one of the investors in P.A. Semi and it was suggested that their fabrication plants would be used to manufacture the PWRficient processors.

PWRficient processors were shipping to select customers, and were set to be released for worldwide sale in Q4 2007.

There were rumors that P. A. Semi had a relationship with Apple that suggested Apple would be the premier user of the PWRficient processors. That relationship supposedly ended with the Mac transition to Intel processors when Apple switched from the PowerPC to Intel's Core processors for their entire line of computers.

Acquisition by Apple 
On 23 April 2008, Apple announced that they had acquired P. A. Semi for $278 million. The acquisition came with P.A. Semi's 150-person engineering team. While Apple's previous relationship with P. A. Semi would indicate that Apple could use their processors, P. A. Semi manufactures only Power ISA processors, which Apple did not use at the time.

On 11 June 2008, during the annual Worldwide Developer's Conference, Apple CEO Steve Jobs said that the acquisition was meant to add the talent of P. A. Semi's engineers to Apple's workforce and help them build custom chips for the iPod, iPhone, and other future mobile devices such as the iPad. P.A. Semi has said that they were willing to supply their PWRficient PA6T-1682M chip on an end-of-life basis, if the Power ISA license that P.A. Semi holds from IBM could be transferred to the acquiring company.

References

External links 

PA Semi attacks performance/Watt
Board level products

2003 establishments in California
2008 disestablishments in California
2008 mergers and acquisitions
American companies established in 2003
American companies disestablished in 2008
Apple Inc. acquisitions
Companies based in Palo Alto, California
Computer companies established in 2003
Computer companies disestablished in 2008
Defunct computer companies of the United States
Defunct semiconductor companies of the United States
Electronics companies established in 2003
Electronics companies disestablished in 2008
Fabless semiconductor companies
Manufacturing companies based in California
Technology companies based in the San Francisco Bay Area